Sam Salu (also Romanized as Sām Sālū and Sāmsālū) is a village in Nazluy-ye Jonubi Rural District in the Central District of Urmia County, West Azerbaijan Province, Iran. At the 2006 census its population was 47 in 12 families.

References 

Populated places in Urmia County